Everett Hindley is a Canadian politician, who was elected to the Legislative Assembly of Saskatchewan in a by-election on March 1, 2018. He represents the electoral district of Swift Current as a member of the Saskatchewan Party.

Cabinet positions

References 

Living people
Saskatchewan Party MLAs
People from Swift Current
21st-century Canadian politicians
Year of birth missing (living people)
Members of the Executive Council of Saskatchewan